Laser Books was a line of 58 paperback science fiction (SF) novels published from 1975 to 1977  by Canadian romance powerhouse Harlequin Books. Laser published three titles per month, available by subscription as well as in stores. The books were limited to 50,000-60,000 words. They were numbered as a series, though each was a standalone novel. All the covers were painted by Hugo Award winning artist Kelly Freas.

Editorial problems
Tim Powers, whose first book was published by Laser, has said that Epitaph in Rust was "mangled" by the editors at Laser Books. An unedited version was later issued by a different publisher.  Piers Anthony had problems with their publication of his novel  But What Of Earth?. This novel was also issued later, through Tor Books.

Harlequin edited the Laser books to conform to the standards then imposed on the Harlequin Romances. This included prohibition of blasphemous and scatological words and explicit sexual scenes, but not of sexual situations and implied sex. There was also a tendency to edit to correct grammar and exclude slang in exposition but not in dialogue.

When Harlequin closed the Laser line, all rights were reverted to the authors. Several works including Jerry Pournelle's Exile to Glory had been accepted and the acceptance payment made, but the book was not yet published. Those were also returned to the authors without any attempt to reclaim the advances paid. The Laser line was important to many beginning writers and greatly expanded the market for 50,000 to 60,000 word books. Many Laser books were later published by Pocket, Ace Books, and Tor. Some remain in print.

Titles
0. Seeds of Change by Thomas F. Monteleone, 1975, 
 This book was not numbered, and was not part of the actual series. It was a "Laser Books Limited Collector's Edition", not available for sale, given away at selected bookstores to launch the series and then given away with subscriptions to Laser Books or with mail-in orders. This novel was also given away at science fiction conventions in 1975, starting many science fiction fans collecting them.
1. Renegades of Time by Raymond F. Jones, 1975, 
2. Herds by Stephen Goldin, 1975, 
3. Crash Landing on Iduna by Arthur Tofte, 1975, 
4. Gates of the Universe by Robert Coulson with Gene DeWeese, 1975, 
5. Walls Within Walls by Arthur Tofte, 1975, 
6. Serving in Time by Gordon Eklund, 1975, 
7. Seeklight by K. W. Jeter, 1975, 
8. Caravan by Stephen Goldin, 1975, 
9. Invasion by Aaron Wolfe (pseudonym of Dean R. Koontz), 1975, 
10. Falling Toward Forever by Gordon Eklund, 1975, 
11. Unto the Last Generation by Juanita Coulson, 1975, 
12. The King of Eolim by Raymond F. Jones, 1975, 
13. Blake's Progress by Ray Nelson, 1975, 
14. Birthright by Kathleen Sky, 1975, 
15. The Star Web by George Zebrowski, 1975, 
16. Kane's Odyssey by Jeff Clinton, 1976, 
17. The Black Roads by J. L. Hensley, 1976, 
18. Legacy by J. F. Bone, 1976,  
19. The Unknown Shore by Donald Malcolm, 1976, 
20. Space Trap by Juanita Coulson, 1976, 
21. A Law for the Stars by John Morressy, 1976, 
22. Keeper by Joan Hunter Holly, 1976, 
23. Birth of Fire by Jerry Pournelle, 1976, 
24. Ruler of the World by J. T. McIntosh, 1976, 
25. Scavenger Hunt by Stephen Goldin, 1976, 
26. To Renew the Ages by Robert Coulson, 1976, 
27. The Horde by Joseph Green, 1976, 
28. The Skies Discrowned by Timothy Powers, 1976, 
29. The Iron Rain by Donald Malcolm, 1976, 
30. The Seeker by David Bischoff with Christopher Lampton, 1976, 
31. Galactic Invaders by James R. Berry, 1976, 
32. Then Beggars Could Ride by Ray Nelson, 1976, 
33. The Dreamfields by K. W. Jeter, 1976, 
34. Seas of Ernathe by Jeffrey Carver, 1976, 
35. I, Aleppo by Jerry Sohl, 1976, 
36. Jeremy Case by Gene DeWeese, 1976, 
37. The Meddlers by J. F. Bone, 1976, 
38. Ice Prison by Kathleen Sky, 1976, 
39. Brandyjack by Augustine Funnell, 1976, 
40. Master of the Stars by Robert Hoskins, 1976, 
41. Future Sanctuary by Lee Harding, 1976, 
42. Cross of Empire by Christopher Lampton, 1976, 
43. Spawn by Donald Glut, 1976, 
44. But What Of Earth? by Piers Anthony and Robert Coulson, 1976, 
45. Finish Line by Stephen Goldin, 1976, 
46. Dance of the Apocalypse by Gordon Eklund, 1976, 
47. Epitaph in Rust by Timothy Powers, 1976, 
48. Rebels of Merka by Augustine Funnell, 1976, 
49. Tiger in the Stars by Zach Hughes, 1976, 
50. West of Honor by Jerry Pournelle, 1976, 
51. Mindwipe! by Steve Hahn, 1976, 
52. The Extraterritorial by John Morressy, 1977, 
53. The Ecolog by Ray Nelson, 1977, 
54. The River and the Dream by Raymond F. Jones, 1977, 
55. Shepherd by Joan Hunter Holly, 1977, 
56. Gift of the Manti by J. F. Bone and Roy Meyers, 1977, 
57. Shadow on the Stars by Robert B. Marcus Jr., 1977,

References

External links
 

Science fiction book series
Books with cover art by Frank Kelly Freas
Harlequin books
Harlequin Enterprises